Keyner Yamal Brown Blackwood (born 30 December 1991) is a Costa Rican professional footballer who plays for Liga FPD club Herediano and the Costa Rica national team.

Career

Professional 
Brown began his career with Brujas in 2010. He spent his entire career in Costa Rica, before going on loan to Major League Soccer side Houston Dynamo on 3 August 2016. The Dynamo rejected the option to buy and Brown returned to Herediano at the end of 2016.

Honors 
Herediano
 Costa Rican Primera División: Clausura 2015, Clausura 2016, Clausura 2017, Apertura 2018, Apertura 2019
 CONCACAF League: 2018

References

External links

1991 births
Living people
People from Limón Province
Association football defenders
Costa Rican footballers
C.S. Herediano footballers
Houston Dynamo FC players
Liga FPD players
Major League Soccer players
Costa Rica international footballers
Costa Rican expatriate footballers
Expatriate soccer players in the United States
Costa Rican expatriate sportspeople in insular areas of the United States